Phascus pallidus is a species of leaf beetle found in Eritrea, Saudi Arabia. and Namibia. It was first described by Édouard Lefèvre in 1884, from the highlands of Hamasien (today part of Eritrea).

Subspecies
There are two subspecies of  P. pallidus:

 Phascus pallidus australis Zoia, 2019: found in Namibia
 Phascus pallidus pallidus Lefèvre, 1884: found in Eritrea and Saudi Arabia

References

Eumolpinae
Beetles of Africa
Beetles of Asia
Insects of the Arabian Peninsula
Insects of Eritrea
Insects of Namibia
Beetles described in 1884
Taxa named by Édouard Lefèvre